The 1988 NHL Entry Draft was the 26th NHL Entry Draft. It was held at the Forum in Montreal, Quebec.

The last active player in the NHL from this draft class was Teemu Selanne, who retired after the 2013–14 season.

Selections by round
Below are listed the selections in the 1988 NHL Entry Draft. Club teams are located in North America unless otherwise noted.

Round one

Round two

Notes
1* The Minnesota North Stars pick went to the New York Rangers as the result of a trade on November 13, 1986 that sent Bob Brooke and the Rangers fourth-round pick in 1988 NHL Entry Draft to the North Stars in exchange for Curt Giles, Tony McKegney and this pick.

2* The Boston Bruins pick went to the Edmonton Oilers as the result of a trade on March 8, 1988 that sent Andy Moog to the Bruins in exchange for Geoff Courtnall, Bill Ranford and this pick.

3* The Buffalo Sabres pick went to the Montreal Canadiens as the result of a trade on November 18, 1986 that sent Tom Kurvers to the Sabres in exchange for this pick.

4* The Edmonton Oilers pick went to the Minnesota North Stars as the result of a trade on March 2, 1988 that sent Kent Nilsson to the Oilers in exchange for cash and this pick.

Round three

Notes
1* The Pittsburgh Penguins pick went to the Montreal Canadiens as the result of a trade on December 17, 1987 that sent Perry Ganchar and the 62nd overall pick to the Penguins in exchange for this pick.

2* The New York Rangers' third-round pick went to the Detroit Red Wings as the result of a trade on July 29, 1986 that sent Kelly Kisio, Lane Lambert, Jim Leavins and Detroit's fifth-round pick in 1988 NHL Entry Draft to the Rangers in exchange for Glen Hanlon, the Rangers' third-round pick in 1987 NHL Entry Draft and this pick.

3* The Hartford Whalers pick went to the Edmonton Oilers as the result of a trade on December 12, 1986 that sent Dave Semenko to the Whalers in exchange for this pick.

4* The Montreal Canadiens pick went to the Pittsburgh Penguins as the result of a trade on December 17, 1987 that sent the 46th overall pick to the Penguins in exchange for Perry Ganchar and this pick.

Round four 

 The New York Rangers' fourth-round pick went to the Minnesota North Stars as the result of a trade on November 13, 1986 that sent Curt Giles, Tony McKegney and Minnesota's second-round pick in 1988 NHL Entry Draft to the Rangers in exchange for Bob Brooke and this pick.
 The Rangers previously acquired this pick as the result of a trade with the Minnesota North Stars on October 24, 1986 that sent that sent Mark Pavelich to Minnesota in exchange for this pick.

Round five

 The Minnesota North Stars first round pick went to the Calgary Flames as a result of a trade on May 20, 1988 that sent the rights to Igor Liba to Minnesota in exchange for this pick.
 The New York Rangers pick went to the Buffalo Sabres as the result of a trade on December 31, 1987 that sent Paul Cyr and the 202nd overall pick to the Rangers in exchange for Mike Donnelly and this pick.
 The New York Rangers' fifth-round pick went to the Winnipeg Jets as the result of a trade on June 8, 1987 that sent Brian Mullen and Winnipeg's tenth-round pick in 1987 NHL Entry Draft to the Rangers in exchange for the Rangers' third-round pick in 1989 NHL Entry Draft and this pick.
 The Rangers previously acquired this pick as the result of a trade with the Detroit Red Wings on July 29, 1986 that sent that sent Glen Hanlon, the Rangers' third-round picks in 1987 NHL Entry Draft and in 1987 NHL Entry Draft to Detroit in exchange for Kelly Kisio, Lane Lambert, Jim Leavins and this pick.

Round six

Notes
1* The Pittsburgh Penguins pick went to the Los Angeles Kings as the result of a trade on February 4, 1988 that sent Bryan Erickson to the Penguins in exchange for Chris Kontos and future considerations that became this pick.

2* The Toronto Maple Leafs 6th round pick went to New York Islanders the as the result of a trade on March 8, 1988 that sent Brian Curran to the Leafs in exchange for this pick.

3* The Detroit Red Wings pick went to Vancouver Canucks the as the result of a trade on November 21, 1986 that sent Doug Halward to the Red Wings in exchange for this pick.

Round seven

Notes
1* The Minnesota North Stars pick went to the Winnipeg Jets as the result of a trade on March 7, 1988 that sent the rights to John Blue to the North Stars in exchange for this pick.

Round eight

Round nine

Round ten

Notes
1* The Buffalo Sabres pick went to the New York Rangers as the result of a trade on December 31, 1987 that sent Mike Donnelly and the 89th overall pick to the Sabres in exchange for Paul Cyr and this pick.

2* The Boston Bruins 10th round pick was sent to the New Jersey Devils as the result of a trade on March 8, 1988 that sent Steve Tsujiura to the Boston Bruins in exchange for this pick.

Round eleven

Round twelve

Draftees based on nationality

See also
  1988 NHL Supplemental Draft
  1988–89 NHL season
  List of NHL players

References

External links
 1988 NHL Entry Draft player stats at The Internet Hockey Database

Draft
National Hockey League Entry Draft